Kalenow-e Olya (also Romanized as Kalenow-ye ‘Olyā; also known as Kalenow-ye Bālā) is a village in Birun Bashm Rural District, Kelardasht District, Chalus County, Mazandaran Province, Iran. At the 2006 census, its population was 666, in 167 families.

References 

Populated places in Chalus County